Julius Willigrod (October 27, 1857 – November 27, 1906) was an American professional baseball player whose career ran from 1879 to 1882. He played Major League Baseball for the Cleveland Blues and Detroit Wolverines in 1882.

Early years
Willigrod was born in Marshalltown, Iowa. His father, Edward Willigrod, was an immigrant from Hanover, Prussia who worked as a machinist.  His mother, Catharine, was an immigrant from Bavaria.  Willigrod had a twin sister, Julia.

Professional baseball player
Willigrod played minor league baseball for the Omaha Green Stockings in the Northwestern League in 1879 and then traveled west to California where he played for two seasons with the San Francisco Knickerbockers of the California League.  During one of his two seasons with San Francisco, he led the league in runs scored despite compiling a batting average of only .207.

Between July 15 and August 19, 1882, Willigrod played ten games in Major League Baseball, principally as an outfielder, for the Detroit Wolverines and Cleveland Blues of the National League. He compiled a .154 batting average in 39 at bats. In his final major league game, he hit a triple and scored four runs, a record that still stands for the most runs scored in a player's final major league game.

Later years
Willigrod died in 1906 at age 49 in San Francisco, California.  The cause of death was a gastric hemorrhage due to a stomach ulcer. He was buried in the Riverside Cemetery in Marshalltown, Iowa.

References

1857 births
1906 deaths
19th-century baseball players
Major League Baseball outfielders
Detroit Wolverines players
Cleveland Blues (NL) players
Omaha Green Stockings players
San Francisco Knickerbockers players
Baseball players from Iowa
Sportspeople from Marshalltown, Iowa